Neil Stephen McCallum (born 31 August 1987) is a Scottish footballer who plays as a striker. He began his career with St Johnstone.

Playing career
McCallum progressed through the youth system of St Johnstone and had loan spells with Alloa Athletic and Forfar Athletic before injuries forced him to leave full-time football in 2008. He signed for Perth-based junior club Kinnoull in August 2008. He then signed for Bankfoot Athletic in February 2009, having been on the transfer list at Kinnoull.

References

External links

1987 births
Living people
Footballers from Perth, Scotland
Scottish footballers
St Johnstone F.C. players
Alloa Athletic F.C. players
Forfar Athletic F.C. players
Scottish Football League players
Association football forwards
Scottish Junior Football Association players
Kinnoull F.C. players
Bankfoot Athletic F.C. players